Smithbucklin, based in Chicago, is an association management company, founded in 1949 with secondary offices in Washington, D.C.; Old Lyme, Connecticut; St. Louis, Missouri; and San Ramon, California.

William E. Smith started the company with nine client organizations—headlined by the Popcorn, Seed Pea and Frozen Potato Products Institutes—and just 22 employees. On July 24, 2004, Smith died at age 90.

During the Dot-com bubble of 1997–2001, some of SmithBucklin's client associations encountered "painful" financial cutbacks.

On June 29, 2005, the company became employee-owned.

Acquisitions
Acquisitions have fueled Smithbucklin's recent growth, including public relations firm Tech Image Ltd. (2007); medical education provider The France Foundation (2011); stakeholder-alliance firm Inventures Inc. (2013); ad-sales firm The Townsend Group (2015); incentive-travel company SDI (2016); and live-event experience design agency 360 Live Media (2018).

See also
 Association management company
 Meeting and convention planner
 Event management

References

External links
 Smithbucklin

Business services companies established in 1949
Companies based in Chicago
Management organizations
1949 establishments in Illinois